Thelymitra benthamiana, commonly called the leopard sun orchid or blotched sun orchid, is a species of orchid in the family Orchidaceae and is endemic to Australia. It has a single leathery leaf and up to ten yellowish green flowers with brownish spots, blotches and patterns. The column is yellow with deeply fringed wings and the lobe on top of the anther has a large lump on its top.

Description
The lobe on the top of the anther club-like lump on its summit. Flowering occurs from September to December but flowering is more prolific after fire the previous summer.

Taxonomy and naming
Thelymitra benthamiana was first formally described in 1871 by Heinrich Gustav Reichenbach and the description was published in Beitrage zur Systematischen Pflanzenkunde. The specific epithet (benthamiana) honours George Bentham.

Distribution and habitat
The leopard sun orchid is widespread and common, growing in heath and forest. In Western Australia it often grows around the edges of granite outcrops. It is found in Western Australia between Geraldton and Israelite Bay, in southern and western Victoria, in south-eastern South Australia and on Flinders Island in Tasmania.

Conservation
Thelymitra benthamiana is classified as "not threatened" in Western Australia by the Western Australian Government Department of Parks and Wildlife.

References

External links

benthamiana
Endemic orchids of Australia
Orchids of Western Australia
Plants described in 1871